Terry Knight (born Richard Terrance Knapp; April 9, 1943 – November 1, 2004) was an American rock and roll music producer, promoter, singer, songwriter and radio personality, who enjoyed some success in radio, modest success as a singer, but phenomenal success as the original manager-producer for Grand Funk Railroad and the producer for Bloodrock.

Early career 
Knight was born in Lapeer, Michigan, United States. After graduating from high school in 1961, he briefly attended Alma College before dropping out. Knight's music career began as a DJ at Flint, Michigan's Top 40 rock station WTAC, then going to Detroit in 1963 where he replaced Dave Shafer as "Jack the Bellboy" on WJBK. The following year, he moved across the river to CKLW in Windsor, Ontario. One of the first American DJs to air the Rolling Stones, he hosted a late night show from high-powered CKLW, bringing the British Invasion to the Northern states. He was awarded the honorary title of "The Sixth Stone" for his early support of the Stones. By the end of 1964, however, Knight had left CKLW and the radio business, intending to pursue his own career in music.

Around 1965, Knight fashioned a songwriting and performing career in Flint by becoming the front man for Terry Knight and the Pack. With this band, Knight recorded a handful of regional hits for Lucky Eleven Records, part of the Cameo-Parkway Records group, including his self-penned generation gap anthem "A Change On the Way", and scored two national hits, a cover of the Yardbirds' "(You're a) Better Man Than I", and his ultra-lounge reading of Ben E. King's "I (Who Have Nothing)", which peaked at No. 46 nationally. The band left three garage rock classics before breaking up in 1967. Brownsville Station honored Knight and the Pack with a cover of the Knight-penned "Love, Love, Love, Love, Love" on their 1973 album Yeah!

Producer and solo career 
In 1967 Knight moved to New York City, and attempted a solo career as a singer and staff producer with the Cameo-Parkway label, with limited success. He produced and wrote a handful of tracks by other artists, including garage band Question Mark & the Mysterians, and the easy-listening International Pop Orchestra. He also scored music for the 20th Century Fox noir film, The Incident (1967).

Knight traveled to London in 1968, hoping to become a recording artist or producer for the Beatles' newly formed Apple Records. Knight met Paul McCartney and was present at some of the recording sessions for the band's 1968 double album The Beatles (also known as the "White Album"), including the session when Ringo Starr temporarily quit the group. Knight was surprised to find the band members arguing with each other. He soon left London after he was unable to negotiate a contract with acceptable terms.

"Saint Paul" 
In early 1969, Knight secured a producer's contract with Capitol Records which also allowed him to release his own songs as a solo artist. He wrote and recorded a single, "Saint Paul", which may have contributed to the "Paul is dead" hoax that erupted late in the year. The cryptic lyrics of the song are generally thought to allude to Knight's failed relationship with McCartney and his apparent belief that the Beatles would soon break up. The lyrics do not refer to death, but were interpreted by some fans as containing clues. The ending repeats the phrase "hey Paul" in an arrangement that sounds similar to the Beatles' song "Hey Jude". There are two versions, both in stereo. The full five-minute version contains a high-pitched voice singing lines from Beatles songs, including "Hello, Goodbye", "Lucy in the Sky with Diamonds" and "She Loves You", while the four-minute edit does not contain additional song excerpts.

Initial copies of the single listed Knight's company Storybook Music as the publisher of "Saint Paul". After Capitol received a cease and desist letter from the Beatles' music publisher, Maclen Music (the U.S. division of Northern Songs), the record was pulled from distribution.

A deal was then worked out between Knight and Maclen Music. About a month later, in May 1969, "Saint Paul" was reissued with a publishing credit by Maclen. The second pressing of the record also contained a note on the label that stated that "Hey Jude" was "used by permission". The reassignment of the publishing rights made Knights' song the only non Lennon–McCartney tune owned by Maclen. "Saint Paul" reached the top 40 in some cities in the upper Midwest region but failed to make the Billboard Hot 100 national chart. The fact that "Saint Paul" was re-published by Maclen was seen by some Beatle fans as evidence of a conspiracy involving Knight, the Beatles and the "Paul is dead" rumor.

"Saint Paul" was re-recorded in 1969 by New Zealand singer Shane and became one of the best-selling singles of the 1960s in that country. In the early 1990s author Andru Reeve repeatedly tried to interview Knight while writing a book about the "Paul is dead" hoax. Reeve was unable to get Knight to talk about the song.

Grand Funk Railroad 
Still working as a producer with Capitol, Knight renewed his connection with two former Pack members, guitarist Mark Farner and drummer Don Brewer. Knight encouraged the two to add a new bass player and become a "power trio" along the lines of Cream. The group quickly added former Mysterians bassist Mel Schacher and changed their name to 'Grand Funk Railroad'. While becoming their manager-producer, Knight helped steer the trio to international fame, beginning with his getting them onto the bill—for free—at the 1969 Atlanta Pop Festival. This live performance convinced Capitol to sign the trio. For the next two years, Grand Funk Railroad became the most popular rock attraction in the United States despite mixed critical reviews that Knight exploited as part of their appeal; he also discovered and produced the Fort Worth, Texas group Bloodrock, who hit the Top 40 in early 1971 with the unlikely death anthem "D.O.A. (Dead On Arrival)".

Between Grand Funk and Bloodrock, Knight racked up an unprecedented eight gold albums while simultaneously waging a war of words with Rolling Stone over the magazine's frequent pannings of the two acts. But by early 1972, both Grand Funk and Bloodrock had severed their professional relations with Knight. In Grand Funk's case, it involved court actions that kept the band tied up for almost two full years; they had demanded full royalty accounting and accused Knight of double-dipping as manager-producer, while the trio had not been getting all the monies they had earned. For his part, Knight would claim the band had had only three months left on their contract with him when they first took him to court, and could have been free with half the legal aggravation; the trio ultimately won their separation from Knight but at heavy cost, before adding keyboard player Craig Frost and continuing a successful recording and touring career through 1976.

Life after Grand Funk 
Knight was also dropped from Capitol soon after the Grand Funk court actions were resolved and began his own label, Brown Bag Records, releasing albums and singles by Mom's Apple Pie, John Hambrick, Wild Cherry and Faith Band. None of them found commercial success and, in late 1973, Knight retired permanently from show business. He associated with super model Twiggy and raced cars with film star Paul Newman in the mid-1970s before becoming addicted to cocaine, which consumed him. By the 1980s he had straightened himself out, settling in Yuma, Arizona with his daughter Danielle. He melded into the community working in advertising sales for a weekly newspaper.

Death 
On November 1, 2004, Terry Knight was murdered at the age of 61. He was stabbed multiple times by his teenage daughter's boyfriend Donald A. Fair in their shared apartment in Temple, Texas, after Knight attempted to intercede in an argument over Fair's use of methamphetamine. Fair claimed he was high on methamphetamine at the time of the killing, in an attempt to mitigate his sentence. Fair was sentenced on May 26, 2005 to life in prison. Terry Knight was cremated and buried in a family plot in Lapeer, Michigan. He is survived by daughter, Danielle. Four years after his death, Terry Knight and The Pack were voted into the Michigan Rock and Roll Legends online Hall of Fame.

Discography

As Producer

Singles
 The Bossmen - Baby Boy/You And I (1966)
 The Debutantes - Love Is Strange/A New Love Today (1966)
 The Rites Of Spring - Why (?)/Comin' On Back To Me (1966)
 Dandy Dan - If Love Is/(I Don't Stand) A Ghost Of A Chance (1967)
 The Jayhawkers - Come On (Children)/A Certain Girl (1967)
 Sir Cedric Smith - Until It's Time For You To Go/To Sing For You (1967)
 Barry Drake - Roll On River (1971)
 Barry Drake - I Won't Be Reconstructed (1971)

Albums
 Terry Knight & The Pack - Terry Knight and the Pack (1966)
 Terry Knight & The Pack - Reflections (1967)
 Grand Funk Railroad - On Time (1969)
 Grand Funk Railroad - Grand Funk (1969)
 Bloodrock - Bloodrock (1970)
 Grand Funk Railroad - Closer to Home (1970)
 Bloodrock - Bloodrock 2 (1970)
 Grand Funk Railroad - Live Album (1970)
 Grand Funk Railroad - Survival (1971)
 Bloodrock - Bloodrock 3 (1971)
 Grand Funk Railroad - E Pluribus Funk (1971)
 John Hambrick - Windmill In A Jet Filled Sky (1972)

 References 

 External links 
  Terry Knight – R.I.P. by David K. Tedds for Creem Online''.
 Terry Knight's Killer Convicted.
 
 Terry Knight @ Discogs.com

1943 births
2004 deaths
American radio DJs
American murder victims
Record producers from Michigan
Songwriters from Michigan
People murdered in Texas
Male murder victims
Musicians from Michigan
Radio personalities from Detroit
Deaths by stabbing in Texas
20th-century American musicians
People from Lapeer, Michigan
Terry Knight and the Pack members
 2004 murders in the United States